Four regiments of the British Army have been numbered the 94th Regiment of Foot:

94th Regiment of Foot (1760), raised in 1760
94th Regiment of Foot (1780), raised in 1780
94th Regiment of Foot (1794), raised as the Scotch Brigade in 1794
94th Regiment of Foot (1823), raised in 1823